Aquele Beijo (English: That Kiss) is a Brazilian telenovela produced by TV Globo. It is written by Miguel Falabella, Flávio Marinho and Antonia Pellegrino, and directed by Roberto Talma and Cininha de Paula, it premiered on October 17, 2011, replacing Morde & Assopra.

Plot 
Cláudia (Giovanna Antonelli) and Rubinho (Victor Pecoraro) have been dating since they were teenagers, but the differences between the two prevent them from staying together. Vicente (Ricardo Pereira) gave up his love for Lucena (Grazi Massafera) to commit himself to his studies. Vicente and Lucena manage to resume their romance, but Vicente ends up falling in love with Claudia. Rubinho and Lucena team up to prevent this new romance.

Cast 

 Giovanna Antonelli as Cláudia Collaboro
 Ricardo Pereira as Vicente Santelmo
 Marília Pêra as Maruschka Lemos de Sá
 Herson Capri as Alberto
 Victor Pecoraro as Rubinho Lemos de Sá
 Grazi Massafera as Lucena Zambelli
 Sheron Menezzes as Sarita
 Leilah Moreno as Grace Kelly
 Cláudia Jimenez as Mãe Iara
 Bruno Garcia as Joselito
 Diogo Vilela as Felizardo Barbosa
 Stella Miranda as Locanda Barbosa
 Bia Nunnes as Toinha/Damiana Barbosa
 Bruna Marquezine as Beleza "Belezinha" Falcão
 Fiuk as Agenor Barbosa
 Elizângela as Íntima Falcão
 Juliana Didone as Brigite
 Daniel Torres as Orlandinho
 Fernanda Souza as Camila Collaboro
 Frederico Reuter as Ricardo
 Luís Salém as Ana Girafa
 Jandir Ferrari as Raul
 Ângela Rebello as Vera
 Cynthia Falabella as Estela Jardim
 Edgar Bustamante as Ticiano
 Ernani Moraes as Olavo
 Frederico Volkmann  as Tide
 Hugo Gross as Tibério
 Jacqueline Laurence as Mirta Lemos 
 Jorge Maya as Cabo Rusty
 José D'Artagnan Júnior as Valério
 Karin Roepke as Alana
 Karina Marthin as Odessa
 Luciano Borges as Teleco
 Maria Eduarda  as Cléo
 Maria Gladys as Eveva
 Mary Sheyla  as Marisol
 Maria Maya as Raíssa Barbosa
 Maria Vieira as Brites Santelmo
 Maria Zilda Bethlem as Olga
 Mariah da Penha  as Dalva
 Marina Motta as Amália Santelmo
 Nívea Maria as Regina
 Patrícia Bueno as Dona Otília
 Paula Frascari as Pilori
 Priscila Marinho as Taluda
 Raoni Carneiro as Sebastião Santelmo
 Renata Celidônio as Marieta
 Renata Ghelli as Jorgette
 Sandro Christopher as Bob Falcão
 Thereza Piffer as Gisele
 Thelma Reston as Violante
 Zezeh Barbosa as Deusa

References

External links
 Official website 
 

2011 telenovelas
Brazilian telenovelas
TV Globo telenovelas
2011 Brazilian television series debuts
2012 Brazilian television series endings
Brazilian LGBT-related television shows
Portuguese-language telenovelas
Television shows set in Rio de Janeiro (city)